American mahjong, also spelled mah jongg, is a variant of the Chinese game mahjong. American mahjong utilizes racks to hold each player's tiles, jokers, and "Hands and Rules" score cards. It has several distinct gameplay mechanics such as "The Charleston", which is a set of required passes, and optional passing of the tiles. 

American mahjong is played with four players using mah jongg tiles. The goal of the game is to be the first, by picking and discarding, to match one's tiles to a specific hand from the annually distributed scorecard published by the National Mah Jongg League (NMJL) and American Mah-Jongg Association (AMJA). Scoring is done by matching the points assigned to each pre-determined hand on the annually distributed NMJL card & AMJA card.

History
Joseph Park Babcock, a representative of the Standard Oil Company in Shanghai, was importing mahjong sets to the United States in great numbers by 1923. To increase interest in the game, which was sometimes impenetrable to Westerners, he rewrote and published new, simpler rules that became the American standard. When the National Mah Jongg League, Inc. published a volume of "Official American Rules" in 1935, the American style further morphed into a very distinct form.

American mah jongg tournament standards and rules were established in 1986, when the National Mah Jongg League and Mah Jongg Madness jointly conducted their first annual Mah Jongg Tournament at Sea. This tradition of championship tournaments at sea continued for over 34 years. Now there are American mah jongg tournaments conducted throughout the United States, and consist of players from America and Canada. Mah Jongg Madness conducts more than a dozen tournaments a year and an annual NMJL cruise culminates in the National Mah Jongg Convention in Las Vegas every March. 

Tournaments are now played according to the Standardized National Mah Jongg Tournament Rules, which were codified and published in 2005. In 2011, Mah Jongg Master Points (MJMP) were established to post an individual's tournament scores. The MJMP website formulates the scores (awarding bonus points to the top 10 winners of an event), and ranking the individual players.  There are 10 ranks for players, based on the accumulation of these points.

Using tiles

The total number of mahjong tiles in the American mahjong is 152, as shown below.

Dots
From one dot to nine dots, four tiles of each type, 36 tiles in total.

For the convenience of American players, Arabic numbers are usually written on the tiles, stating how many dots it is.

Bamboos (bams)
From one bamboo to nine bamboos, four tiles of each type, 36 tiles in total.

The one bamboo also known as the bird.

For the convenience of American players, Arabic numbers are usually written on the tiles, stating how many bamboos it is.

Characters (craks)
From one crak to nine craks, four tiles of each type, 36 tiles in total.

For the convenience of American players, Arabic numbers are usually written on the tiles, stating how many craks it is.

Winds
The four types of winds are: East, South, West and North, four tiles of each type, 16 tiles in total.

For the convenience of American players, letters "E" (for East), "S" (for South), "W" (for West) and "N" (for North) are usually written on the tiles.

Dragons
The three types of dragons are: Red dragon, Green dragon, and White dragon (also known as soap), four tiles of each type, 12 tiles in total. Among them, the red dragon is even used to replace the red "中", and the green dragon is even used to replace the green "發", avoiding the use of Chinese characters.

 or 

For the convenience of American players, English words "Red", "Green" and "White" are usually written on the tiles, stating which dragon it is. Besides, some will say letter "C" (for "中" in Cantonese Romanisation), "F" (for "發" in Cantonese Romanisation), "P" or "B" (for "白" in Cantonese Romanisation).

Flowers
In the demonstration of NMJL, the two groups of flowers are "Spring (春), Summer (夏), Autumn (秋), Winter (冬)" and "Fortunate (福), Luxurious (祿), Longevity (壽), Noble (貴)". 

However, the two groups of normal flowers commonly found in mahjong tiles, i.e. "Spring, Summer, Autumn, Winter" and "Plum blossom (梅), Orchid (蘭), Chrysanthemum (菊), Bamboo (竹)" can also be used. 

Each flower associated with an Arabic number and a specific direction, as below:

For the convenience of American players, English words "Spring", "Summer", "Autumn", "Winter" and "Plum.B", "Orchid", "Chrys", "Bamboo" are usually written on the tiles, stating which flower it is. Besides, some will say Arabic numbers 1 to 4.

Jokers
American Mahjong also has 8 Joker tiles, they are all-purpose tiles.

Examples
There are a number of regional designs for mahjong tiles from different regions. Here are some examples.

Rules
The hands are usually placed on the rack, and the tiles called and shown must be placed on top of the rack.

Compositions of tiles
The compositions of tiles are: single, pair, pung, kong, quint, and sextet.

There is no chow. At the same time, the traditional composition winning hands (four compositions and one pair) is not present in the American mahjong.

Joker tiles
Joker tiles cannot be passed to the other players during Charleston (exchanging tiles). When 3 Joker tiles goes together, they can be a composition.

Game processing 
The players roll dice to determine East. High roll is designated as East. Each player then stacks a row of 19 tiles, two tiles high in front of them (for a total of 38 tiles). Then the East player will decide the opening position with two dice, and each person will take 13 tiles in hand (14 tiles for the East player). After the tiles in hand have been sorted, Charleston -- exchange 3 tiles with other players -- will be conducted. It takes three stages, usually twice, the second time in reverse order.

 Each player passes three unwanted tiles to his/her right, and receives three tiles from the player on the left.
 Each player passes three unwanted tiles to the player across, and receives three tiles from the player across.
 Each player passes three unwanted tiles to the player on his/her left, and receives three tiles from the player on the right.

The above is one Charleston. A second Charleston takes place unless any player chooses to stop the passing. The second Charleston is done in reverse order: left, across, right.

On the last pass of each Charleston (first left, second right), a blind pass is permitted. This means a player can take one, two, or three tiles that were passed to him/her and, without looking at the tile(s), can pass it/them instead of tiles from his/her hand. Each pass still includes three tiles.

Following the Charleston passing, an optional pass take place. Players have the option of passing zero, one, two or three tiles to the player across from him/her. The two players agree on the number of tiles to be passed.

The game begins with East discarding a tile, and proceeds until all the tiles are taken from the walls of tiles or a player calling Mahjong or self-draws.

Scoring method
NMJL publishes an official rulebook every year, and the winning hands will change every year.

The minimum score for a winning hand is 25 points. In the case of calling Mahjong (winning), the player who discarding a tile from which another player calls mahjong must pay twice the number of points, while the other player pays only the number of points. In a self-draw, the other three players pay twice as the points.

References

Further reading

Links
National Mah Jongg League (NMJL)
Official National Mah Jongg League Internet Game
American Mah-Jongg Association (AMJA)
Standardized National Mah Jongg Tournament Rules
Mah Jongg Master Points
Yellow Mountain Imports: How to Play American Mahjong
Mahjongtime: American Style Mahjong Rules
Danville Alamo Walnut Creek: The Rules for Modern American Mah-jongg
Mahjong Wiki

Games and sports introduced in the 1920s
Mahjong